Salavina Department is a department of Argentina in Santiago del Estero Province.  The capital city of the department is Los Telares.

References

Departments of Santiago del Estero Province